American singer Summer Walker has released two studio albums, two EPs, one mixtape, thirteen singles and eight music videos.

Albums

Studio albums

Mixtapes

Compilation albums

Extended plays

Singles

As lead artist

As featured artist

Other charted songs

Guest appearances

Notes

References

External links 
 
 

Rhythm and blues discographies
Discographies of American artists